Nicole Arendt and Manon Bollegraf were the defending champions but only Bollegraf competed that year with Katrina Adams.

Adams and Bollegraf lost in the quarterfinals to Serena Williams and Venus Williams.

Virginia Ruano Pascual and Paola Suárez won in the final 7–6, 6–4 against Amanda Coetzer and Arantxa Sánchez Vicario.

Seeds
Champion seeds are indicated in bold text while text in italics indicates the round in which those seeds were eliminated. The top four seeded teams received byes into the second round.

Draw

Final

Top half

Bottom half

External links
 1998 Italian Open Women's Doubles Draw

Women's Doubles
Doubles